Roseomonas nepalensis is a species of Gram negative, strictly aerobic, coccobacilli-shaped, wine-red-colored bacterium. It was first isolated from oil-contaminated soil from Biratnagar, Nepal. The name is derived from the country from which it was first isolated.

R. nepalensis can grow in the 15-40 °C range and pH 6.0-10.0.

References

External links
Type strain of Roseomonas nepalensis at BacDive -  the Bacterial Diversity Metadatabase

Rhodospirillales
Bacteria described in 2017